Brigitte Nansoz (born 20 August 1962 in Evionnaz, Valais, Switzerland) is a retired Swiss alpine skier who competed in the 1980 Winter Olympics.

External links
 sports-reference.com
 

1962 births
Living people
Swiss female alpine skiers
Olympic alpine skiers of Switzerland
Alpine skiers at the 1980 Winter Olympics
Sportspeople from Valais
People from Saint-Maurice District
20th-century Swiss women